Daniel Deusser (born 13 August 1981) is a German equestrian and Olympic bronze medalist. He represented his country at the 2016 Summer Olympics. He is nicknamed "Double D."
His career reached a higher level starting from 2002, when he was part of team Germany at the Young Rider European Championships. With his top partner Killer Queen, he was selected to represent Germany at Rio de Janeiro  Olympic Games in 2016. Daniel Deusser is the current world number five (March 2022).

International Championship Results

References

External links
 
 
 
 

1981 births
Living people
German male equestrians
Equestrians at the 2016 Summer Olympics
Olympic equestrians of Germany
Olympic bronze medalists for Germany
Olympic medalists in equestrian
Medalists at the 2016 Summer Olympics
Equestrians at the 2020 Summer Olympics